Krough House is a historic Queen Anne style house located at 146 Central Avenue, Salinas, California. It is one of four surviving examples of the Queen Anne houses that characterized Central Avenue in the 1890s. The house was listed on the National Register of Historic Places on January 18, 1982.

History

The Krough House is a one-story, wood-frame, single-family residence built in a Queen Anne style. It has redwood siding with a pitch gable roof covered with composition shingles. A small window appears just above two bay windows located at the front of the house. A staircase leads to a redwood paneled front door and porch. The rear of the house has a sun porch and rear entrance. The house has a small cellar with an entrance outside. In the 1890s, Central Avenue was a street of many Queen Anne houses. Today, the Krough House is one of only four of the houses remaining.

The Krough House has gone through several owners. Belli & Fred Christensen, AIA Architects, purchased the house in 1978 and did a major restoration of the house in 1979. The renovation cost between $40,000 and 50,000. It included redoing the plumbing, rewiring, replacing plaster on all the walls, remodeling the bathroom, stripping the hardwood floors, replacing the back porch, reroofing, adding a paved parking lot, running brick walks around the building, and new landscaping. Today, it is the home of the law office of Mario J. Martinez, a criminal defense attorney.

Peter Krough

Peter Peterson Krough Jr., (1864-1926) was born in April 1864 in Slesvig, Germany. His father, Captain Peter P. Krough Sr. (1836-1882), was as a retired sea captain. His mother was Botilla Sandberg (1836-1909) of Loit, Denmark, now a municipality in the district of Schleswig-Flensburg in Germany. The family came to Central California in the April 1870. His brothers were Charles and Frederick Krough. They grew up in Watsonville, California. All three sons went to Northwestern University as Pharmacists. 

Krough moved from Watsonville to Salinas and established a pharmacy on Main Street. He built the Krough House on 146 Central Avenue. He married Anna Elizabeth Hughes (1867-1960) on April 18, 1888, in Salinas. They had one daughter Olga E. (1899-1990). Olga knew John Steinbeck who lived three houses down at the John Steinbeck House on 132 Central Avenue. Her husband, Lester Michael Tynan (1898-1988) founded the Tynan Lumber Company in 1908. 

Krough died on January 18, 1926, in San Francisco. A funeral was held from Aston & Neal's funeral home in Watsonville. His interment was at the Independent Order of Oddfellows Cemetery in Watsonville.

See also
 National Register of Historic Places listings in Monterey County, California

References

External links

 Martha Heasley Cox Center for Steinbeck Studies, SJSU
 Office of Historic Preservation - Krough House

  

Houses on the National Register of Historic Places in California
Houses on the National Register of Historic Places in Monterey County, California
Queen Anne architecture in California
Houses completed in 1900
Houses in Monterey County, California
Buildings and structures in Monterey, California
National Register of Historic Places in Monterey County, California